Lapsi may refer to:

 Lapsi (Christianity), Christian apostates during the Decian persecutions
 Lapsi (fruit), a fruit from Nepal
 Laapsi, a sweet dish from Northern India made with broken wheat